Messier 110, or M110, also known as NGC 205, is a dwarf elliptical galaxy that is a satellite of the Andromeda Galaxy in the Local Group.

Early observational history

Charles Messier never included the galaxy in his list, but it was depicted by him, together with M32, on his drawing of "Nébuleuse D'Andromède", later known as the Andromeda Galaxy. A label of the drawing indicates that Messier first saw the object in 1773. M110 was independently discovered by Caroline Herschel on August 27, 1783; her brother William Herschel described her discovery in 1785. The suggestion to assign the galaxy a Messier number was made by Kenneth Glyn Jones in 1967, making it the last member of the Messier List.

Properties
This galaxy has a morphological classification of pec dE5, indicating a dwarf elliptical galaxy with a flattening of 50%. It is designated peculiar (pec) due to patches of dust and young blue stars near its center. This is unusual for dwarf elliptical galaxies in general, and the reason is unclear. Unlike M32, M110 lacks evidence for a supermassive black hole at its center.

The inner region has sweeping deficiencies in its interstellar medium IM, most likely expelled by supernova explosions. Tidal interactions with M31 may have stripped away a significant fraction of the expelled gas and dust, leaving the galaxy as a whole, as it presents, deficient in its IM density.

Novae have been detected in this galaxy, including one discovered in 1999, and another in 2002. The latter, designated EQ J004015.8+414420, had also been captured in images taken by the Sloan Digital Sky Survey (SDSS) that October.

Local context

About half of the Andromeda's satellite galaxies are orbiting it along a highly flattened plane, with 14 out of 16 following the same sense of rotation. One theory proposes that these 16 once belonged to a subhalo surrounding M110, then the group was broken up by tidal forces during a close encounter with Andromeda.

See also
 List of Messier objects

External links

Messier 110 Data Sheed and additional information – Telescopius.   (Deep Sky Objects Browser has been renamed and reformatted – the old links below no longer work correctly)
Messier 110 data sheet, altitude charts, sky map and related objects – Deep Sky Objects Browser
Messier 110 amateur astrophotography – Deep Sky Objects Browser
 
 SEDS: Elliptical Galaxy M110
 

Dwarf elliptical galaxies
Peculiar galaxies
Local Group
Andromeda Subgroup
Andromeda (constellation)
110
NGC objects
00426
02429
2429
17730810
Discoveries by Caroline Herschel